Dana Abed Kader (born on 21 June 1996) is a Romanian handball player for Măgura Cisnădie. She plays mainly as a centre back but can also play as a pivot or left wing.

Achievements
IHF Youth World Championship:
Gold Medalist: 2014

Personal life
She is of Syrian descent through her father. Her father lives in Syria. Dana lives with her sister, mother and grandmother in Bucharest. Her sister, Sara, is also a handballer.

References

1996 births
Living people
People from Raqqa Governorate
Romanian female handball players
Romanian people of Syrian descent